Quintus is a given name and a surname in various languages.

Quintus may also refer to:

 Quintus (praenomen), a Latin praenomen in ancient Rome

People
 Lucius Quintus Cincinnatus Lamar (1825–1893)
 Lucius Quintus Cincinnatus Lamar I (1797–1834)
 Quintus Ancharius (disambiguation)
 Quintus Antistius Adventus (120s–?)
 Quintus Arrius (disambiguation)
 Quintus Aurelius Symmachus (died 402)
 Quintus Caecilius Metellus (disambiguation)
 Quintus Caecilius Metellus Nepos (consul 98 BC) (c. 135 BC–55 BC)
 Quintus Cassius Longinus
 Quintus Cornelius Pudens
 Quintus Curtius Rufus
 Quintus Ennius (239–169 BC)
 Quintus Fabius Ambustus (disambiguation)
 Quintus Fabius Maximus Rullianus
 Quintus Fabius Maximus Gurges (disambiguation)
 Quintus Fabius Maximus Verrucosus (c. 280–203 BC)
 Quintus Fabius Pictor
 Quintus Fufius Calenus (? BC–40 AD)
 Quintus Fulvius Flaccus (consul 237 BC)
 Quintus Gargilius Martialis
 Quintus Horatius Flaccus (Horace, the poet)
 Quintus Hortensius (died 50 BC)
 Quintus Ligarius
 Quintus Lollius Urbicus
 Quintus Lutatius Catulus (died 87 BC)
 Quintus Marcius Rex (disambiguation)
 Quintus Mucius Scaevola Pontifex (died 82 BC)
 Quintus Mucius Scaevola (disambiguation)
 Quintus Novius
 Quintus Pedius (died 43 AD)
 Quintus Petillius Cerialis
 Quintus of Phrygia or Quintus the Wonder-Worker (died 285), saint of the Eastern Orthodox Church
 Quintus Pleminius
 Quintus Pompeius Falco
 Quintus Roscius Gallus (died 62 BC)
 Quintus Sertorius (died 73 AD)
 Quintus Servilius Caepio (disambiguation)
 Quintus Smyrnaeus, Greek writer
 Quintus Tullius Cicero (died 43 BC)
 Quintus Veranius (died 57 AD)

Other uses
 Quintus (vocal music), the fifth voice in a piece of vocal polyphony
 Schempp-Hirth Quintus, Open Class glider

See also